Wu Qing-feng (born 1982) , also known as Greeny and credited as Wu Tsing-fong, is a Taiwanese singer-song writer, composer, arranger, and lyricist. Born in Taipei, he is a founding member and the lead vocalist of Oaeen (Sodagreen) and is the major composer and lyricist of the band. Aside from producing the music for the band, he also writes songs for numerous Mandarin singers. Having nominated at the Golden Melody Award, Global Chinese Golden Chart and so on, he has won several music awards, including the 18th Golden Melody Award for Best Composer in 2007 and the 27th Golden Melody Award for Best Lyricist in 2016. Qing-Feng Wu started to go solo in 2018 to perform and release his works. In 2019, he released his debut solo studio album Spaceman, for which he was nominated in several categories at the 31st Golden Melody Award and won the 31st Golden Melody Award for Best Male Mandarin Singer. In 2021, he was, again, nominated for the Best Male Mandarin Singer for his second solo album Folio Vol.1：One and One.

Early life and career beginnings 
Wu was born in Taipei, Taiwan and is the youngest son in the family. He went to The Affiliated Senior High School of National Taiwan Normal University (HSNU)  and joined the school magazine club as the president and the art editor. He applied to study in the Department of Chinese Literature of National Chengchi University (NCCU) in 2000, double-majoring in the Department of Advertising and minoring in the Department of Business Administration and in the Department of Education.

Influences: music 
Without receiving any formal training, Qing-Feng Wu taught himself piano and music theory out of interest. As Qing-Feng Wu's elder sister started to learn to play the piano when he was an elementary school student, he used to observe her playing and practiced secretly when no one else was home. Qing-Feng Wu enjoyed going to record shops and only listened to classical music, such as the works of Claude Debussy, Erik Satie along with several of his favorite composers.

When he was in junior high school, he listened to Faye Wong's album Sky given by his elder sister, and since then, he "has started to listen to all kinds of genres". He talked about it in an interview: "Retrospectively, that was the time when music was truly beautiful...from 1994 to 2000. To me, the songs of those years are the most impressive. It probably has something to do with my adolescence. Many of the songs from that time are even more trendy and edgier than those now".Qing-Feng Wu is deeply inspired by the following music artists: Faye Wong, A-Mei, Faith Yang, Jeff Buckley, Tori Amos, Björk, Ringo Sheena, Radiohead, Chyi Yu and Ai Jing. Qing-Feng Wu has often covered the works of the above artists in his performance.

Influences: writing 
Qing-Feng Wu has always been highly sensitive to words. At the age of 3 or 4, he was taught to write Chinese characters by his grandfather. Whenever there were visitors coming, his grandfather would have him recognize words and recite newspaper aloud as a performance. Qing-Feng Wu therefore was able to recognize a great number of words at a very young age. When he was an elementary school boy, he even edited a personal dictionary by comparing several dictionaries. When in college, Qing-Feng Wu admired contemporary poets Hsia-Yu (Katie Lee, 夏宇) and Li Chen (陳黎). Qing-Feng's lyrics style has partially inherited the experimentalism and the deconstructive method linguistically and syntactically from the two poets. He also mentioned that the foundation of his lyrics writing may have been built along the process of word-recognition and his habit of reading Chinese dictionaries as a child.

Early works 
Qing-Feng Wu first tried to create music when he was in the third year of senior high school after participating in the school music competition Tien-Yun Award (天韻獎). Although he signed up for the competition without having any works ready, he soon wrote his first song Peeping (窺) and more than a dozen songs were composed one after another in the same month. In the end, he won the championship in the Composition Category with his work Peeping and another championship in the Solo Singing Category by performing Tanya Chua's Ji Nian (紀念, Remember). Qing-Feng Wu once mentioned that if he had not won first prize at Tien-Yun Award for Composition Category, he would not have realized that he was able to write songs and might have never thought about writing any other songs.

In order to sign up for NCCU Golden Melody (政大金旋獎) in 2001, he started the band Sodagreen with Claire Hsieh, Jyun-Wei Shih and his high school friend Xin-Ge (新哥). By covering Stephanie Sun's My Desired Happiness (我要的幸福), he entered the Solo Singing Final and the Composition Final at NCCU Golden Melody Award with his work Be Late For One Thousand Years (遲到千年). In 2002 Sodagreen participated in NCCU Golden Melody Award again and not only did they win the championship in the Team Category with the work Audiovisual And Illusion In The Air, but also won three more prizes, including the championship, Best Lyrics and Best Composition in Composition Category with the work Flying Fish (飛魚). From2001 to 2004, Qing-Feng Wu completed more than 100 songs. About half of them became the works for Sodagreen and the rest of the songs were successively used by other artists.

Career

2004 – Present: Sodagreen 

On May 30, 2004, Sodagreen had the concert School Rock at NCCU and released the single Audiovisual And Illusion In The Air (空氣中的視聽與幻覺) as their official debut. Since then, Qing-Feng Wu has participated in various music collaborations as an individual aside from performing and releasing works with Sodagreen. The collaborations include:

 In 2004, "Ms. Pheromone (費洛蒙小姐)" in the stage play Touching Skin (踏青去) is Qing-Feng Wu's first music composition for the lyrics.
 In 2004, Faith Yang's song "Nu Jue (女爵, Dame)" is Qing-Feng Wu's first custom-made work for an artist.
 In 2005, Qing-Feng Wu featured in Makiyo Kawashima (川島茱樹代) 's studio album Makiyo and Rene Liu's studio album Heard.

2018 – present: Solo work 
On January 1, 2017, Sodagreen finished their final performance and went hiatus. After taking a break for a year, Qing-Feng Wu announced to embark his solo career officially in Spring 2018, attending Spring Wave Music and Art Festival (春浪音樂節) in May as the first performance of his return. Since going solo, Qing-Feng Wu has dabbled in numerous new fields, including self-teaching formal music arrangement on computer, releasing the EP Everybody Woohoo that is pop-oriented, mentoring participants in the idol-oriented talent shows.

 In June 2018, Qing-Feng Wu took part in the talent show The Coming One 2 (明日之子 第二季) produced by Tencent Video. He was a "Xing Tui Guan (星推官)", an advisor as well as a judge, in the "Du Xiu Sai Dao"(獨秀賽道, Solo Race Track) of the show, leading participants including Wei-Ze Cai (蔡維澤), Lumi Xu (許含光), Yi-Hao Zhang (張洢豪) and Yu-Ming Ceng (曾育茗).
 In January 2019, Qing-Feng Wu attended the talent show Singer 2019 (歌手2019) produced by Hunan Television as a "Chuan Jiang Ren"(串講人, host) and also joined the competition in the show.
 In September 2019, Qing-Feng Wu released his debut solo album Spaceman and started his Space In Space (太空備忘記) Concert Tour which was unfortunately cancelled in 2020 due to the outbreak of COVID-19. 
 On November 14 and 15 2020, at Cloud Gate Theater in Tamsui, Qing-Feng Wu had Recto and Verso (上下冊) Concert, combining music performance with theatrical elements to create a brand new show experience.

Artistry

Lyrics 
Wu's lyrics have introduced the art of literacy to Mandopop. The topics range from the gazes at personal life experiences to the social depiction and its allegory. In 2009, Qing-Feng's Be Late For One Thousand Years was selected to be a rhetoric material in the Chinese textbook for the second-year junior high school students.

Vocals 
Qing-Feng Wu is good at singing with mixed voice ( a mixture of true voice and falsetto voice close to head voice), and with his nasal resonance, he can transit between true voice and falsetto seamlessly. His singing technique has forged a genderless voice. Qing-Feng Wu's way of singing also has something to do with his deviated nasal septum. His vocal range lies between A2 to C6, stretching over 26 intervals and owning more than 3 octaves, making him a singer with a very wide vocal range in Mandopop.

Personal life 
Qing-Feng Wu does not celebrate his birthday in any form, let alone receive gifts. He is used to taking his birthday light because he sees the day of his birth as the day of his mother's suffering. Having his birthday mentioned by others agonizes him. He mentioned that his friends do know about his disinterest in celebrating his birthday.

Solo discography

Extended plays

Studio albums 

|}

Singles

Songwriting and collaboration 
Qing-Feng wrote his first song "Peeping" in 2000 and won the championship at HSNU Tien-Yun (Heavenly Melody) Award when he was in the third year of senior high school. Since then, Qing-Feng has been very productive as his accumulated works, both published and unpublished, are over hundreds. 90 percent of the songs in Sodagreen are written by Qing-Feng. He also writes songs and lyrics for his fellow artist friends, such as A-mei, S.H.E, Kay Tse, Alan Tam, Mr., Jolin Tsai, Angela Zhang, Sandy Lam, Rainie Yang, JJ Lin, Yoga Lin, Jeff Chang, Eason Chan, Paige Su, Wan Fang, Jam Hsiao, Gigi Leung, Joey Yung, Aska Yang, Tanya Chua, Cyndi Wang, Stefanie Sun, Valen Hsu, Karen Mok, Ricky Hsiao, Lala Hsu, Rene Liu and others.

Other contributions

Concerts 

 Space In Space Concert Tour (2019–2020) 
 16 Leaves Concert  (2020)
 Recto and Verso Concert (2020)

Host

Filmography

Publications

Awards and nominations

References

External links 
 
 
 
 
 
 
 Wu Tsing-fong on Spotify

1982 births
Living people
Affiliated Senior High School of National Taiwan Normal University alumni
Musicians from Taipei
National Chengchi University alumni
Taiwanese Buddhists
Taiwanese Mandopop singer-songwriters
Writers from Taipei
21st-century Taiwanese male singers